B-Side Players is an American band formed in 1994. The band incorporates the sounds of Cuba, Jamaica, Mexico and Brazil with the funk, rock, jazz and hip-hop rhythms of their homeland. The band also drops a bit of Cumbia, gritty street Samba, Son Montuno and Jarocho into the mix. Described as War meets Lenny Kravitz by way of Ben Harper, the players have expanded their sound by playing with the likes of Harper, Ozomatli, The Wailers, James Brown, War and some of Cuba's best bands. They are signed to Jazz label Concord Music Group.

Karlos "Solrak" Paez, the man behind the B-Side Players, grew up in a musical family. His father Ezequiel Paez is a trombone player and musical arranger who spent 17 years in Los Moonlights from Tijuana and 10 years in La Banda Del Recodo.

Discography
Renacimiento (1997)
Culture of Resistance (1999)
Movement (2001)
Maiz (2002)
Fire In The Youth (2007)
Radio Afro Mexica (2009)
Revolutionize (2012)

Current and Former Members
 Karlos "Solrak" Paez - vocals, guitar (founding member)
 Sergio Hernández - bass (founding member)
 Damian DeRobbio - bass
 Paul Hernández - guitar 
 Luis “The General” Cuenca - cymbals, drums, percussion and vocals
 Reagan Branch - Sax
 Vykki Milliman - flute
 Robert Sánchez - keyboard 
 Josh Hernández - drums
 Joaquin Hernández - drums
Gerry Guevara - bass
 Emmanuel Alarcon - lead guitar, cuatro puertorriqueño, vocals
 Aldo Perretta - charango, tres cubano, jarana veracruzana, ronrroco, cuatro venezolano, kena, zampoña
 Russ Gonzales - tenor sax
 Beto Perretta - drums, vocals
 Mike Benge - Trombone
 Ryan Moran - drums
 Michael Cannon - drums
 Camilo Moreno - congas and percussion
 Jamal Siurano - alto sax
 Kevin Nolan - trombone, trumpet
 Andy Krier - keyboards
Omar Lopez - bass
josiah McGinley - Sax
Giovanni Mejia- Guitar
Fabio Alejo Rojas - Keyboards

References

External links
 Official Site

American funk musical groups
American Latin musical groups
Musical groups from San Diego